Law and Disorder is a 1940 British comedy crime film directed by David MacDonald and starring Alastair Sim, Diana Churchill and Barry K. Barnes. The screenplay concerns a young solicitor who defends a number of petty criminals accused of sabotage. The film was made at Highbury Studios, with sets designed by art director James A. Carter.

The film premiered at Gaumont Haymarket in London on 7 June 1940.

Cast
 Alastair Sim as Samuel Blight  
 Diana Churchill as Janet Preston 
 Barry K. Barnes as Larry Preston  
 Edward Chapman as Inspector Bray 
 Austin Trevor as Heinrichs  
 Ruby Miller as Mrs Honeycombe
 Leo Genn 
 Geoffrey Sumner 
 Glen Alyn 
 Torin Thatcher
 Carl Jaffe 
 Cyril Smith

Critical reception
TV Guide rated the film 2 out of 4 stars, writing that "The plot is not much, but the script is packed with wisecracks and one-liners that give this picture some needed pizazz. Enjoyable on its own level."

References

External links

1940 films
British spy comedy films
British crime comedy films
Films set in London
1940s crime comedy films
1940s spy comedy films
Films directed by David MacDonald (director)
Films shot at Highbury Studios
British black-and-white films
1940 comedy films
1940s English-language films
1940s British films